Al Jahrah District is one of the districts of Jahra Governorate in Kuwait. It is agriculturally based. 
The main city is Al-Jahrah (Arabic: اجهرة )

Districts of Al Jahra Governorate